Jarvis White was a member of the Wisconsin State Assembly.

Biography
White was born in April 1833 in Whiting, Vermont. During the American Civil War, White enlisted in the Union Army and eventually reached the rank of captain. During the Second Battle of Deep Bottom, he received a serious wound in his thigh. Afterwards, White became a businessman in Milford, Massachusetts before moving to Davenport, Iowa in 1874.

He settled South Superior, Wisconsin in 1890, where he was a dealer of wallpaper, oils and paints. The following year, he married Loreta Hickman. White died at his home in South Superior on August 8, 1904.

Political career
White was elected to the Assembly in 1896. Additionally, he was an alderman and Postmaster of South Superior. He was a Republican.

References

People from Whiting, Vermont
People from Milford, Massachusetts
Politicians from Davenport, Iowa
Politicians from Superior, Wisconsin
People of Vermont in the American Civil War
Republican Party members of the Wisconsin State Assembly
Wisconsin city council members
Wisconsin postmasters
Union Army officers
Union Army soldiers
19th-century American merchants
Businesspeople from Massachusetts
1833 births
1904 deaths
19th-century American politicians
Military personnel from Massachusetts
Military personnel from Wisconsin
Military personnel from Iowa